Dominican University may refer to:

 Dominican University (Illinois) a private, Catholic university in River Forest, Illinois, United States
 Dominican University of California, an independent university of Catholic heritage in Marin County, California, United States
 Dominican University College a bilingual Roman Catholic university in Ottawa, Ontario, Canada
 Dominican University New York, an independent university of Catholic heritage in Orangeburg, New York, United States

See also
Dominican College (disambiguation)